Gernot Roll (9 April 193912 November 2020) was a German cinematographer, film director and script writer. He collaborated on several films with directors Edgar Reitz and Sönke Wortmann. He was regarded as an expert on literary adaptations and film biographies, such as The Buddenbrooks, filming Thomas Mann's novel in eleven television episodes directed by Franz Peter Wirth, and the same work again in 2008 in the film directed by Heinrich Breloer.

Life 
Roll was born in Dresden and grew up in Pirna. At the age of 14 he began training as a cameraman and then worked at the DEFA Studios in Berlin-Babelsberg. His first film as a camera assistant was the fairy tale film The Singing Ringing Tree. In 1960 he went to West Germany to work at Bavaria Film in Munich. From 1976, he worked as a freelance cinematographer. He was considered an expert in literary adaptations and film biographies. In 1979, he was the cinematographer for The Buddenbrooks, eleven episodes for television of Thomas Mann's novel, directed by Franz Peter Wirth.

Roll's breakthrough came with the celebrated 16-hour TV series Heimat – Eine deutsche Chronik by Edgar Reitz in 1984. Among his films were Caroline Link's Jenseits der Stille and Helmut Dietl's . He also worked with directors including Jo Baier, Axel Corti and Peter Keglevic.

Roll's debut as a director was in the film . Roll was the director for films including the children's classic  (The Robber Hotzenplotz) in 2006. In 2008, he was the cinematographer for Heinrich Breloer's film Die Buddenbrooks.

Roll was one of the founding members of the Deutsche Filmakademie in 2003.

He was married to the producer Rita Serra-Roll; their son is the actor Michael Roll (born 1961). They lived in the Hunsrück.

Roll died on 12 November 2020 in Munich after a severe illness, at the age of 81.

Filmography 
Films for which Roll was the cinematographer include:

Awards 
 1982, 1985, 1993, 2000 Grimme-Preis
 1992, 1993, 2002 Deutscher Filmpreis – Best Cinematography
 1998 
 2013 Order of Merit of the Federal Republic of Germany
 2014 Bavarian Film Awards Honorary award

References

External links 

 
 

1939 births
2020 deaths
Film people from Dresden
German cinematographers
Recipients of the Cross of the Order of Merit of the Federal Republic of Germany